Kumari Vimla Verma popularly known as "BUA JI" (बुआजी) sister of father born 1 July 1929) was a political and social worker and a Member of Parliament elected from the Seoni constituency in the Indian state of Madhya Pradesh being an Indian National Congress candidate.

Early life and education
Vimla was born on 1 July 1929 in Nagpur, Maharashtra. Vimla is a M.A and was educated at Allahabad University, Allahabad.

Career
Vimla is the Founder-Member of
 Education Committee, Seoni
 Arts College, Seoni
 Madhya Pradesh State Social Welfare Board

From 1963 onwards, Vimla has been serving as a Member of the All India Congress Committee (A.I.C.C.) She was elected to the 10th Lok Sabha in 1991. In 1998, she was re-elected to 12th Lok Sabha.

She has worked as Honorary Lecturer for two years. she is also an agriculturist,a good teacher and also an educationist.

Vimla enjoys Literature and Politics. Vimla has been the President of the Hindi Sahitya Samiti, Seoni for several years. Her favorite pastimes are listening to music and studying art. Her passion is to work for the welfare of the society and development of women and children.

Notable Achievements in Indian Politics 
 She has been imprisoned for demonstrating against ill treatment meted out to Smt. Indira Gandhi during Janata regime, 1977–79
 Appointed Observer for Lok Sabha elections in Rajasthan and assembly elections in Uttar Pradesh, Maharashtra and Tamil Nadu by A.I.C.C. 
 Appointed Observer for assessing political situation in five constituencies of Lok Sabha by Late Shri Rajiv Gandhi 
 Vimla has been conferred, Vidhan Kirti award by Madhya Pradesh Legislative Assembly for being the most distinguished legislator and for significant contribution to the legislative business of the House. 
 She has been Chairman, Project implementing Committee, Central Social Welfare Board; General-Secretary, Bharat Yuvak Samaj, Madhya Pradesh; Vice-President, Bharatiya Gramin Mahila Sangh; and Member, Madhya Pradesh Sewa Dal Board;

Positions Held 
 1963-67 - District Convenor, Mahila Wing, Congress, Madhya Pradesh; President, District Congress Committee (D.C.C.), Madhya Pradesh
 1963 onwards - Member, All India Congress Committee (A.I.C.C.)
 1967-90 - Member, Madhya Pradesh Legislative Assembly
 1967-68 - Member, Public Accounts Committee
 1967-69 - General-Secretary, Pradesh Congress Committee (P.C.C.), Madhya Pradesh
 1969-72 - Minister of State, Irrigation and Power, Madhya Pradesh
 1972-75 - Minister of State for Health, Madhya Pradesh
 1977-80 - General-Secretary, P.C.C., Madhya Pradesh (2nd term)
 1979-80 - Member, Committee on Public Undertakings
 1980-85 - Cabinet Minister, Public Work Department, Irrigation, Rural Development and Transport, Madhya Pradesh
 1982-90 - Member, Business Advisory Committee
 1987-88 - Member, General Purposes Committee
 1987-89 - Member, Women and Children Welfare Committee
 1988-89 - Cabinet Minister, Labour and Human Resource Development, Madhya Pradesh
 1989-90 - Cabinet Minister, Food and Civil Supplies and Co-operation, Irrigation, Narmada Development and Public Health Engineering
 1991 - Elected to 10th Lok Sabha
 1991-95 - Chairperson, Committee on Communications; Member, Committee on the Welfare of Scheduled Castes and Scheduled Tribes
 1995-96 - Union Minister of State in the Ministry of Human Resource Development (Department of Women and Child Development)
 1998 - Re-elected to 12th Lok Sabha (2nd term)
 1998-99 - Chairperson, Committee on Absence of Members from the sittings of the House; Member, Committee on Agriculture; Member, General Purposes Committee Member, Consultative Committee, Ministry of Environment and Forests

References

External links

India MPs 1998–1999
India MPs 1991–1996
Women in Madhya Pradesh politics
Articles created or expanded during Women's History Month (India) - 2014
University of Allahabad alumni
1929 births
Living people
Indian National Congress politicians from Madhya Pradesh
20th-century Indian women politicians
20th-century Indian politicians
Politicians from Nagpur
Lok Sabha members from Madhya Pradesh